"Peace in Our Time" is a song by Scottish rock band Big Country, which was released in 1989 as the third and final single from their fourth studio album Peace in Our Time (1988). It was written by Stuart Adamson and produced by Peter Wolf. "Peace in Our Time" reached No. 39 in the UK and remained in the charts for three weeks. A music video was filmed to promote the single.

Background
Adamson described "Peace in Our Time" in a 1990 interview with Melody Maker as a "very Sixties feel protest song, naive but I did it anyway." He added in an interview with Sounds: "I do feel music can be more than a three-minute adrenaline rush, but there's a great danger in viewing a song with too much weight. "Peace in Our Time" was written with irony, but you can be too smart-assed for your own good. It was called a plea for peace when it was really much smaller than that."

In addition to the main release, a limited edition 12" vinyl was also issued in the UK with four live tracks recorded at the Palace Of Sports, Moscow on 2 October 1988.

Reception
On its release, Tony Beard of Record Mirror commented, "This is a grand record, all large guitar solos, awesome power chords and a lyric that could set East-West relations back a few eons if ever the powers that be hear it." Caren Myers of Melody Maker wrote, "This is so ponderously well-meaning it practically grinds to a halt. No tiny gossamer wings could lift this concrete hippopotamus of a single off the ground." As guest reviewers for Number One, Simon Tedd and Shark of Big Bam Boo gave the song three stars. They described it as "just another Big Country record" but one that's "good for fans".

In a review of Peace in Our Time, Peter B. King of The Pittsburgh Press noted the song's "anthemic chorus" and described it as "catchy as the cold going around this newsroom". Brett Milano of The Boston Globe considered the song a "chunky rocker" which "recall[s] better days". William Ruhlmann of AllMusic recommended the song by labelling it an AMG Pick Track.

Track listing
7" single
"Peace in Our Time" - 4:33
"Promised Land" (The R.E.L. Tapes) - 5:39

7" single (UK promo)
"Peace in Our Time" (Radio Edit) - 3:26
"Peace in Our Time" - 4:33

12" single
"Peace in Our Time" - 4:33
"Promised Land" (The R.E.L. Tapes) - 5:39
"Over the Border" (The R.E.L. Tapes) - 5:17
"The Longest Day" (The R.E.L. Tapes) - 6:36

12" single (UK limited edition)
"Peace in Our Time" (Live) - 5:01
"Chance" (Live) - 5:46
"In a Big Country" (Live) - 4:08
"Promised Land" (Live) - 4:52

CD single
"Peace in Our Time" - 4:33
"Chance" - 4:25
"The Longest Day" (The R.E.L. Tapes) - 6:36
"Promised Land" (The R.E.L. Tapes) - 5:39

CD single (US promo)
"Peace in Our Time" - 4:33

Personnel
Big Country
 Stuart Adamson - vocals, guitar
 Bruce Watson - guitar
 Tony Butler - bass
 Mark Brzezicki - drums

Production
 Peter Wolf - producer of "Peace in Our Time"
 Big Country - producers of all tracks except "Peace in Our Time" and studio version of "Chance"
 Steve Lillywhite - producers of studio version of "Chance"
 Nigel Luby - recording of 1988 live tracks from Moscow
 Brian Malouf - engineer and mixing on "Peace in Our Time"
 Jeremy Smith - engineer on "Peace in Our Time"
 Gonzalo Espinoza, Jeff Poe, Kristen Connolly - assistant engineers on "Peace in Our Time"
 Geoff Pesche - mastering

Charts

References

1988 songs
1989 singles
Big Country songs
Songs written by Stuart Adamson
Mercury Records singles
Vertigo Records singles